Bni Salah (بني صالح) is a small town and rural commune in Chefchaouen Province, Tanger-Tetouan-Al Hoceima, Morocco. At the time of the 2004 census, the commune had a total population of 9662 people living in 1384 households.

References

Populated places in Chefchaouen Province
Rural communes of Tanger-Tetouan-Al Hoceima